St. James's Church is an Anglican church in the evangelical tradition in the town of Glossop, Derbyshire, in the north-west of England. Along with St. Luke's Church, it makes up Whitfield Parish within Derby Diocese.

The churchyard contains war graves of three soldiers of World War I.

History
The foundation stone was laid on 27 September 1844 and construction started to the designs of the architect Edwin Hugh Shellard. The church was consecrated on 8 September 1846 by the Bishop of Lichfield. The chancel was enlarged in 1897 by Naylor and Sale, and a vestry added at the turn of the 20th century. In 2000, the church was designated a Grade II listed building.

Organ
The church has a pipe organ by Forster and Andrews dating from 1859. A specification of the organ can be found on the National Pipe Organ Register.

See also
Listed buildings in Glossop

References

Glossop
Churches completed in 1846
Glossop
Glossop, James